Neil Nicholson (born 19 January 1945) is a British former swimmer. He competed in two events at the 1964 Summer Olympics.

He also represented England and won a silver medal in the medley relay event and a bronze medal in the 220 yards breaststroke, at the 1962 British Empire and Commonwealth Games in Perth, Western Australia. At the ASA National British Championships he won the 220 yards breaststroke title in 1963 and one year later won the 110 yards breaststroke title.

References

1945 births
Living people
British male swimmers
Olympic swimmers of Great Britain
Swimmers at the 1964 Summer Olympics
Sportspeople from Gateshead
Commonwealth Games medallists in swimming
Commonwealth Games silver medallists for England
Commonwealth Games bronze medallists for England
Swimmers at the 1962 British Empire and Commonwealth Games
Medallists at the 1962 British Empire and Commonwealth Games